King Daddy Tour is the title of the world tour by the reggaeton superstar Daddy Yankee to support his album King Daddy.

Daddy Yankee's European tour 2014 was named the 2nd most ticketed following the Rolling Stones according to reports from The Spanish Association of Music Promoters.

The attendance of the first European leg was nearly 150,000 fans. In Dominican Republic, the attendance was high. Nearly 20,000 tickets were sold at Puerto Plata and more than 50,000 fans packed the Estadio Olimpico Felix Sanchez, during his performance at Festival Presidente 2014.

During The second European Leg, the tour was renamed "King Daddy Euro Tour" Visiting 19 cities with an attendance of 200,000 fans. During this leg, Daddy Yankee performed for the first time in Israel and the concert was sold out.

At September 19, 2015, he performed at Madison Square Garden, becoming is first show as headliner there since 2007 during The Big Boss Tour. During this concert, his long-time rival Don Omar made a cameo and performed a couple songs. In one part, both made a sort of beef, improvising a cappella, facing for the first time on stage to promote the upcoming tour The Kingdom Tour, causing a euphoria in the fans and later in the social networks and news around the world. Also, part of the concert (especially during the song Machucando) was broadcast live in the last show of Sabado Gigante.

Tour dates

Box Office Data

Notes

References 

2014 concert tours
2015 concert tours
Concert tours of the United States
Concert tours of Europe
Concert tours of South America
Concert tours of Asia